Pselnophorus laudatus is a moth of the family Pterophoridae that is known from Madagascar.

References

Oidaematophorini
Moths described in 1964
Endemic fauna of Madagascar
Insects of Africa
Moths of Madagascar
Moths of Africa